Liturgy is a ballet made by New York City Ballet resident choreographer Christopher Wheeldon to Fratres by Arvo Pärt. The premiere took place on May 31, 2003 at the New York State Theater, Lincoln Center, originated by Jock Soto and Wendy Whelan. Whelan described the piece as "a piece about union".

Videography
In light of the impact of the COVID-19 coronavirus pandemic on the performing arts, New York City Ballet released recording of the ballet, featuring Maria Kowroski and Jared Angle, recorded in 2017.

References

External links 
Jared Angle on Liturgy

New York City Ballet repertory
Ballets by Christopher Wheeldon
2003 ballet premieres
Ballets by Arvo Pärt